American singer and dancer Normani has received multiple awards and nominations. During her time as member of the girl group Fifth Harmony, Normani received multiple awards including two BMI awards for "All in My Head (Flex)" from their album 7/27. In 2017, Normani competed in season 24 of Dancing with the Stars, finishing in third place. As a soloist, she has earned eight BMI Awards, two IHeartRadio Titanium Awards, an MTV Video Music Award, a Soul Train Music Award, a Teen Choice Award and a Webby Award. She has also been nominated at the Brit Awards, the NAACP Image Awards and the Billboard Music Awards.

Awards and nominations

Other accolades

Listicles

Notes

References 

Normani
Awards